Eric Randolph Barnes (born June 16, 1966) is an American former shot putter who held the outdoor world record for the event from 1990 to 2021. He won silver at the 1988 Olympics and gold at the 1996 Olympics.   Only three throwers have been within  of his outdoor world record since it was set. Barnes was banned for 27 months in 1990 for anabolic steroid usage, before he received a lifetime ban in 1998 after testing positive for androstenedione.

Biography

Barnes was born in Charleston, West Virginia, grew up in nearby St. Albans, and began putting the shot in high school. While at A&M, Randy worked with hall of famer conditioning coach Istvan Javorek and throws coach Robert Parker.

He went to the 1988 Seoul Olympics where he put  and earned a silver medal at only 22. He came second to Ulf Timmermann of East Germany, who put .

Six days later he almost matched his world record, throwing  at the Bruce Jenner Invitational in San Jose. Barnes was banned from competing for 27 months after testing positive for the anabolic steroid methyltestosterone at a competition in Malmö, Sweden, on August 7 that same year. He sued to have the suspension overturned but lost. Due to the suspension, he was unable to compete in the 1992 Olympics.

At the 1996 Olympic games, Barnes won the gold medal that eluded him 8 years earlier with a come-from-behind  put on his final attempt. In 1998, he tested positive for androstenedione, an over-the-counter supplement (famously used by baseball player Mark McGwire) that is banned in track and field. Although Barnes claimed he did not know androsten was banned, he was suspended from competition for life.

Barnes later became a long driving competitor, competing to hit a golf ball as far as possible; he qualified for the 2005 World Long Drive Championship.

References

External links
 Official website
 Randy Barnes at Sporting-Heroes

1966 births
Living people
Sportspeople from Charleston, West Virginia
People from St. Albans, West Virginia
Track and field athletes from West Virginia
American male shot putters
Olympic gold medalists for the United States in track and field
Olympic silver medalists for the United States in track and field
Athletes (track and field) at the 1988 Summer Olympics
Athletes (track and field) at the 1996 Summer Olympics
World Athletics Championships athletes for the United States
World Athletics Championships medalists
Doping cases in athletics
American sportspeople in doping cases
Texas A&M Aggies men's track and field athletes
Medalists at the 1996 Summer Olympics
Medalists at the 1988 Summer Olympics
World Athletics indoor record holders
Goodwill Games medalists in athletics
World Athletics Indoor Championships medalists
Competitors at the 1990 Goodwill Games
Competitors at the 1994 Goodwill Games
Sportspeople banned for life